Glenoma is an unincorporated community in Lewis County located off U.S. Route 12, between the towns of Morton and Randle. The area is northeast of Riffe Lake.

History

Glenoma was originally named Vern and briefly as Verndale. The area was later renamed by Beverly Coiner, deriving the moniker by combining glen, meaning "valley", and oma, from the Hebrew word for "a measure of grain"; the name was construed to mean "fruitful valley". The official date of the creation of the town is unknown.

The first covered swimming pool in Lewis County opened in Glenoma in 1961.

Climate
According to the Köppen Climate Classification system, Glenoma has a warm-summer Mediterranean climate, abbreviated "Csb" on climate maps.

Education

Students in the town are served by the White Pass School District.

The Glenoma Elementary school was built in the 1920s. It was rebuilt after a fire in 1932 and razed in 2011 after it had been closed due to low enrollment. Elementary students in the area began attending Randle Elementary School in 2004.

Notes

References

Populated places in Lewis County, Washington
Unincorporated communities in Lewis County, Washington
Unincorporated communities in Washington (state)